Lodigiani is a plural demonym for the Italian city (and province) of Lodi.

It may refer to:

People
Lodigiani is an Italian surname. Notable people with this surname include:
 Alessandro Lodigiani (born 1980), Italian rower
 Dario Lodigiani (1916–2008), American baseball player

Other
 A.S. Lodigiani, Italian football club